Charles Hadley Hamilton (August 5, 1850March 22, 1915) was an American lawyer, businessman, and Republican politician.  He served as city attorney of Milwaukee, Wisconsin, and represented downtown Milwaukee for one term in the Wisconsin State Assembly.  He was the son of Union Army general Charles Smith Hamilton.

Biography
Charles Hadley Hamilton was born in Rochester, New York, in 1850.  At age 2, his father moved the family to Fond du Lac, Wisconsin, where he was educated through the public schools.  After high school, he joined a U.S. survey of Lake Superior and entered the University of Michigan in 1868, graduating as a mining engineer in 1869.

That year, he moved to Milwaukee, Wisconsin, and was employed as a deputy U.S. marshal—his father was then U.S. marshal for the Eastern District of Wisconsin.  While employed as deputy marshal, he studied law and was admitted to the Milwaukee bar in 1872.  Rather than practicing law, he went into business, becoming a junior partner at the paper company of Sylus Van Buren and Co.  Shortly thereafter, at age 24, he was sole owner of the company.

Hamilton was active with the Republican Party of Wisconsin, and worked on the re-election campaign of President Ulysses S. Grant in 1872.  He was subsequently elected to the Wisconsin State Assembly for the 1878 session, representing Milwaukee's 7th ward.

After his Assembly term, he focused on his business interests and was an incorporator of the Menominee Chemical Company in 1883, to manufacture drug supplies.  He was also a founder of the Green Bay Land Company to purchase pine land for extraction.

In April 1894, he was elected city attorney of Milwaukee.  The incumbent, Conrad Krez, however, refused to give up the office, citing an 1889 act of the Wisconsin Legislature which extended the city attorney's term to four years.  Hamilton sued and won his case, enabling him to take office on April 20.  Krez appealed to the Wisconsin Supreme Court, which upheld the circuit court decision.  Hamilton ultimately only served three years of his term, resigning in May 1897 to receive an appointment as special assistant city attorney, a position created by a new law.  The change allowed him to remain in office for another three years at only a slightly reduced salary.

Hamilton died at Milwaukee in March 1915.

References

External links

1850 births
1915 deaths
People from Rochester, New York
Politicians from Milwaukee
19th-century American politicians
Wisconsin city attorneys
Republican Party members of the Wisconsin State Assembly
University of Michigan alumni
19th-century American lawyers